Swissair Asia AG was a subsidiary of Swissair founded due to the legal status of the Republic of China (Taiwan) and territory disputes with the People's Republic of China in order to allow Swissair to continue flying to Taiwan from Switzerland.

History 
Swissair Asia was formed to serve Taipei-Taiyuan, Taiwan, within the Republic of China, while Swissair was maintaining service to the People's Republic of China. It began operating a twice-weekly service between Zürich and Taipei via Bangkok on 7 April 1995. The airline ceased operating when their parent company Swissair went bankrupt in 2001.

Livery 
The aircraft used by Swissair Asia had the Chinese character "" (which means from the Chinese character for "propitious" or "lucky" and phonetic (in southern languages) translation of Switzerland, "", on the tail fin instead of the cross. The kanji character was designed by the Basel-based Japanese calligrapher Sakamoto Sanae (坂本早苗).

Destinations

Asia 
 
 Bangkok – Don Mueang International Airport
 
 Taipei-Taiyuan – Chiang Kai-shek International Airport (Focus city)

Europe 
 
 Zürich – Zürich Airport (Focus city)

Fleet 

Swissair Asia operated the following aircraft:

See also 
 Australia Asia Airlines
 British Asia Airways
 Japan Asia Airways
 KLM Asia
 Air France Asie

References 

Swissair
Defunct airlines of Switzerland
Defunct airlines of Taiwan
Airlines established in 1995
Airlines disestablished in 2001
1995 establishments in Switzerland
1995 establishments in Taiwan
2001 disestablishments in Switzerland
2001 disestablishments in Taiwan
Swiss companies disestablished in 2001
Taiwanese companies established in 1995